Ian Brown (born 1963) is an English musician and lead singer of band The Stone Roses

Ian Brown may also refer to:
Ian Brown (footballer, born 1965), English footballer and manager
Ian Brown (Australian footballer) (1925–2019), Australian rules footballer
Ian Brown (journalist) (born 1954), Canadian radio broadcaster
Ian Brown (swimmer) (born 1965), Australian swimmer
Ian Brown (director) (born 1951), artistic director of West Yorkshire Playhouse, England
Ian Brown (sailor) (born 1954), Australian Olympic sailor

See also
Ian Browne (disambiguation)